Bound Together is an anarchist bookstore and visitor attraction on Haight Street in the Haight-Ashbury neighborhood of San Francisco.  Its Lonely Planet review in 2016, commenting on its multiple activities, states that it "makes us tools of the state look like slackers". The bookstore carries new and used books as well as local authors.

The bookstore is run by a volunteer collective that includes "lifers" who have held shifts there for decades. Bound Together coordinated the first Bay Area Anarchist Bookfair in 1995. It sends books to jails through the Prisoners' Literature Project. A mural outside the bookshop, originally painted in the 1990s by Susan Greene and periodically updated, is titled Anarchists of the Americas and depicts American anarchists including Voltairine de Cleyre, Emma Goldman, and Sacco and Vanzetti, as well as a member's cats. Members of the collective may if they choose put out a chalked sign with a slogan when they are working in the store, and the interior is papered with old posters.

It was founded as "Bound Together Bookstore" in 1976 in a former drugstore at the corner of Hayes and Ashbury Streets by a collective that included Richard Tetenbaum and Joey Cain. In 1983 it moved to Haight Street and was renamed "Bound Together: An Anarchist Collective Bookstore". Like other small businesses in San Francisco, the collective has been affected by rising costs: their rent increased twelvefold between 1983 and 2004. Bound Together is among the independent bookstores included on the San Francisco Chronicle 49-Mile Scenic Route.

References

External links
 
 

Anarchist bookstores
Bookstores in the San Francisco Bay Area
Haight-Ashbury, San Francisco
Companies based in San Francisco
Retail companies established in 1976
1976 establishments in California
Infoshops